Abraham Buijs (7 September 1923 – 4 January 1987) was a Dutch trade unionist and politician.

Born in Arnemuiden, Buijs became a carpenter and joined the General Dutch Construction Union (ANB).  He also joined the Labour Party, winning election to the local council in Vlissingen in 1949.  In 1954, he became secretary of the ANB's Amsterdam branch, and in 1964 he became its president.

As leader of the union, he took it into successive mergers, forming the General Dutch Union of Building and Wood Industries, and then the Construction and Wood Union.  In 1969, he also became president of the International Federation of Building and Wood Workers.  He retired from all his posts in 1985, and died two years later.

References

1923 births
1987 deaths
Dutch trade unionists
Labour Party (Netherlands) politicians
People from Middelburg, Zeeland